The 10th Virginia Cavalry Regiment was a cavalry regiment raised in Virginia for service in the Confederate States Army during the American Civil War. It fought mostly with the Army of Northern Virginia.

Organization
Virginia's 10th Cavalry Regiment, formerly called 1st Cavalry Regiment, Wise Legion and 8th Battalion, Virginia Cavalry, was organized in May 1862. Many of the men were from Richmond, Albemarle, Rockingham, Kanawha, Jackson and Henrico counties of Virginia.

Service
The 10th Virginia Cavalry served in Hampton's, W.H.F. Lee's, Chambliss' and Beale's brigades in the Army of Northern Virginia. After fighting in the Seven Days Battles, it saw action at Antietam, Fredericksburg, Brandy Station, Upperville, Gettysburg, Bristoe, and Mine Run. It was involved in the Wilderness Campaign, the defense of Richmond and Petersburg, and the Appomattox Courthouse operations.

The regiment fought at Gettysburg at 236 soldiers strength.

Officers
Its commanders were Colonels Robert A. Caskie, William B. Clement, and J. Lucius Davis; and Lieutenant Colonel Zachariah S. McGruder.

Captain William Hartman Kable of the 10th Virginia was also the founder of the Kable School, later Staunton Military Academy, many of the facilities of which are now in use by Mary Baldwin College in Staunton, Virginia.

Surrender
The 10th Virginia Cavalry surrendered at Appomattox with 3 officers and 19 men; all others escaped hiding the regimental colors with the help of a local woman.

Gallery

See also

List of Virginia Civil War units
List of West Virginia Civil War Confederate units

References

Further reading
Archibald Atkinston, Jr, Surgeon, CSA, 31st Virginia Infantry and 10th Virginia Cavalry, 1861-65: A Memoir 
Whither bound? By the chaplain 10th Virginia cavalry.

External links

10th Regiment, Virginia Cavalry (1st Cavalry Regiment, Wise Legion) Roster, NPS
Antietam: 10th Virginia Cavalry
10th Virginia Cavalry, Richmond-Petersburg Campaign Site

Units and formations of the Confederate States Army from Virginia
1862 establishments in Virginia
Military units and formations established in 1862
1865 disestablishments in Virginia
Military units and formations disestablished in 1865